Basty Owusu Kyeremateng (born 3 February 1987 in Kumasi) is an Italian footballer who currently plays for A.C.D. Borgopal Calcio. Although born in Ghana, he moved to Italy at a young age.

Biography
Basty started his career along with Giovanni Kyeremateng in Internazionale. He played for its Esordienti team to Primavera, the top of youth teams. In 2005–06 he was awarded the no.43 shirt of the first team, and played once in a club friendly. He wore the no.62 shirt in the 2006–07 season.

In August 2006 he was loaned to Serie D club Alessandria. He then left for Lega Pro teams Canavese, Alghero and Pro Patria. In the 2010/2011 he season played for A.S.D. Vimercatese Oreno and then joined ACD Borgopal on 2 August 2011.

References

External links
 

Italian footballers
Inter Milan players
U.S. Alessandria Calcio 1912 players
F.C. Canavese players
Aurora Pro Patria 1919 players
Association football midfielders
Ghanaian emigrants to Italy
Italian sportspeople of African descent
Footballers from Kumasi
1987 births
Living people
Pol. Alghero players